Air Chief Marshal Sir William Derek Hodgkinson,  (27 December 1917 – 29 January 2010) was a senior Royal Air Force officer. As a bomber pilot in the Second World War, he was shot down and spent time in Stalag Luft III as "Big S", responsible for the security of the escape committee.

Early life
Born near Prestbury, Cheshire, and educated in Repton, Hodgkinson took a short service commission with the RAF in 1936, first flying the Avro Anson multi-role aircraft for RAF Coastal Command and then the American-built Hudson medium-level bomber with No. 220 Squadron RAF.

Second World War
When war was declared, Hodgkinson was responsible for patrolling the English Channel from Heligoland Bight to Stavanger, which included patrols during the Dunkirk evacuation. Hodgkinson was awarded the Distinguished Flying Cross for shooting down a Heinkel HE115 float plane. He then became an instructor with the Operational Training Unit (OTU), where in 1942, as a squadron leader, Hodkinson was selected to form part of "Bomber" Harris's 1,000 bomber raids over Germany. 

The city of Bremen was attacked on the night of 25 June and Hodkinson's Hudson was shot down by a night fighter on the return trip over the Dutch coast. The crew, except Hodgkinson and his navigator were killed. Wounded, Hodgkinson was taken to a hospital as a prisoner of war.

He was later transferred to Stalag Luft III, where he was made responsible for security under the leader of the escape committee "Big X". Stalag Luft III was made famous by the daring mass break-out through tunnels depicted in the film The Great Escape. After several unsuccessful escape attempts, the camp was evacuated ahead of the Russian advance of January 1945 and the prisoners marched  through severe winter weather to the naval PoW camp near Bremen. They were again transferred to Hamburg where they were liberated by the British in April 1945.

Post-war service
After the war, Hodgkinson was appointed Officer Commanding No. 210 Squadron and then joined the Directing Staff at the Australian Joint Anti-Submarine School before becoming Officer Commanding No. 240 Squadron in 1957. He was appointed Station Commander at RAF St Mawgan in Cornwall in 1958 before joining the staff of Lord Louis Mountbatten, then Chief of the Defence Staff, in 1961. Following this, he attended the Imperial Defence College and then became Commandant at the RAF Staff College in 1965 before becoming Assistant Chief of the Air Staff responsible for operational requirements, the role that made him famous for a report detailing the career structure for RAF officers and recommending a meritocracy over the existing class structure, in 1966. Hodgkinson also had a leading role in the development of modern front-line aircraft and equipment, most notably the Panavia Tornado. He went on to be Senior Air Staff Officer at Headquarters Training Command in 1969 and was then appointed as Commander-in-Chief Near East Air Force (including responsibility for British Forces Cyprus and Administration of the Sovereign Base Areas) in 1970 before finishing his career as Air Secretary in 1973 responsible for overseeing cutbacks caused by the withdrawal from the Far East and the Persian Gulf in the 1970s. He retired in May 1976.

Family
In 1939 he married Heather Goodwin; they had a son, Richard born in 1946, and a daughter Elizabeth born in 1949.

References

|-

1917 births
2010 deaths
Graduates of the Royal College of Defence Studies
British World War II pilots
British World War II bomber pilots
Royal Air Force air marshals
Knights Commander of the Order of the Bath
Recipients of the Distinguished Flying Cross (United Kingdom)
Recipients of the Air Force Cross (United Kingdom)
Royal Air Force officers
Military personnel from Cheshire